Post Master (Kannada: ಪೋಸ್ಟ್ ಮಾಸ್ಟರ್) is a 1964 Indian Kannada film, directed and produced by G. V. Iyer. The film stars B. M. Venkatesh, G. V. Shivaraj, Vandhana and Balakrishna in the lead roles. The film has musical score by Vijaya Bhaskar.

Cast

B. M. Venkatesh
G. V. Shivaraj
Vandhana
Balakrishna
B. K. Eshwarappa
G. V. Chennabasappa
Shivashankar
Basavaraj
Papamma
Prabha
Sharada
Leela

Soundtrack
The music was composed by Vijaya Bhaskar.

References

External links
 

1964 films
1960s Kannada-language films
Films scored by Vijaya Bhaskar
Films directed by G. V. Iyer